Cidade Industrial is a Belo Horizonte Metro station on Line 1. It was opened on 30 July 1999, being added to already functioning section of the line from Eldorado to Minas Shopping. The station is located between Cidade Industrial and Gameleira.

References

Belo Horizonte Metro stations
1999 establishments in Brazil
Railway stations opened in 1999